The Michael and Kate Bárány Award for Young Investigators from the Biophysical Society in Rockville, Maryland, "recognizes an outstanding contribution to biophysics by a person who has not achieved the rank of full professor." The award was established in 1992 as the Young Investigator Award and renamed in 1998, when it was endowed by Michael Bárány and Kate Bárány. The Báránys were survivors of The Holocaust who went on to become leading researchers in muscle contraction.

Michael and Kate Bárány Award Laureates
As of 2022, laureates of the award have included:

References

American science and technology awards
Biophysics awards